is a village located in Kunigami District, Okinawa Prefecture, Japan.

As of 2003, the village has an estimated population of 9,529 and a population density of 239.00 persons per km2. The total area is 39.87 km2.

Education
The village operates its public elementary and junior high schools.
 Nakijin Junior High School (今帰仁中学校)
 Amesoko Elementary School (天底小学校)
 Kaneshi Elementary School (兼次小学校)
 Nakijin Elementary School (今帰仁小学校)

Okinawa Prefectural Board of Education operates .

Notable people
Seiji Shimota, novelist
Shun Medoruma, novelist

See also
Nakijin Castle

Notes

External links

 Nakijin official website 

Villages in Okinawa Prefecture
Port settlements in Japan